Vineyard Town is a neighbourhood in Kingston, Jamaica.

References

External links
Aerial view

Populated places in Jamaica
Neighbourhoods in Kingston, Jamaica